Elections to Sheffield City Council were held on Thursday 2 May 2019; one of a number of local council elections taking place across England and Northern Ireland on the same day. One of each ward's three seats was up for election, having last been contested in the 2016 elections.

Election results 

Labour, the Conservatives, the Liberal Democrats and the Green Party fielded candidates in all 28 wards (including six candidates running under the Labour Co-operative label). UKIP fielded candidates in 22 wards. The Yorkshire Party contested six wards, Democrats and Veterans contested three and the Women's Equality Party contested two, with the National Front and the Socialist Party (under the Socialist Alternative label) each fielding one candidate. There were also two independent candidates.

Data on % turnout from.

Overall election result

Turnout 31.2%.

Changes in council composition

Ward results

Beauchief & Greenhill

Incumbent Liberal Democrat councillor Richard Shaw was up for re-election.

Beighton

Incumbent Labour councillor Ian Saunders was up for re-election.

Birley

Incumbent Labour councillor Denise Fox was up for re-election.

Broomhill & Sharrow Vale

The incumbent Green Party councillor and Lord Mayor of Sheffield, Magid Magid, did not defend his seat.

Burngreave

Incumbent Labour councillor Talib Hussain was up for re-election.

City

Incumbent Green Party councillor Robert Murphy did not defend his seat.

Crookes & Crosspool

Incumbent Liberal Democrat councillor Adam Hanrahan did not defend his seat.

Darnall

Incumbent Labour councillor Mary Lea was up for re-election.

Dore & Totley

Incumbent Liberal Democrat councillor Joe Otten was up for re-election.

East Ecclesfield

Incumbent councillor Steve Wilson was up for re-election, having won the seat for Labour in 2016. However, in February 2019 he resigned from the party and continued to sit as an independent. He contested this election as an independent candidate.

Ecclesall

Incumbent Liberal Democrat councillor Paul Scriven did not defend his seat.

Firth Park

Incumbent Labour councillor Abdul Khayum was up for re-election.

Fulwood

Incumbent Liberal Democrat councillor Andrew Sangar was up for re-election.

Gleadless Valley

Incumbent Labour councillor Chris Peace did not defend her seat.

Graves Park

Incumbent Liberal Democrat councillor Sue Auckland was up for re-election.

Hillsborough

Incumbent Labour councillor George Lindars-Hammond was up for re-election.

Manor Castle

Incumbent Labour councillor Lisa Banes did not defend her seat; she contested the West Ecclesfield seat instead.

Mosborough

Incumbent Labour councillor David Barker was up for re-election.

Nether Edge & Sharrow

Incumbent Labour councillor Mohammad Maroof was up for re-election

Park & Arbourthorne

Incumbent Labour Co-op councillor Ben Miskell was up for re-election.

Richmond

Incumbent Labour councillor Dianne Hurst was up for re-election.

Shiregreen & Brightside

Incumbent Labour Co-op councillor Dawn Dale was up for re-election.

Southey

Incumbent Labour councillor Mike Chaplin was up for re-election, having won a by-election in 2017 to hold the seat for Labour.

Stannington

Incumbent Liberal Democrat councillor Penny Baker was up for re-election.

Stocksbridge & Upper Don

Incumbent UKIP councillor Keith Davis did not defend his seat.

Walkley

Incumbent Labour Co-op councillor Ben Curran was up for re-election.

West Ecclesfield

Incumbent UKIP councillor John Booker was up for re-election. Labour’s candidate, Lisa Banes, was a sitting councillor for Manor Castle ward.

Woodhouse

Incumbent Labour councillor Jackie Satur was up for re-election.

References

2019
2019 English local elections
2010s in Sheffield
May 2019 events in the United Kingdom